Jim Boeven (born 11 November 1967) is a German born film, television and voice actor. After establishing himself as a star in his native Germany, he moved to Los Angeles in 2007.

Early life 

Boeven was born in Menden, Germany. He studied acting from 1991 to 1993 at UCLA and the Actors Center in Los Angeles, and then at the Hollywood Acting Workshop in Cologne.

Career 

He began his career in Cologne and quickly became a series regular in the series Alle lieben Julia, Jede Menge Leben, and Jets – Leben am Limit. He has had a prolific European TV career, appearing in 450 episodes that have aired in 24 countries as either a lead/star recurring and/or guest star.

He appeared in his first American feature, Marching Out of Time, in 1993. Since then, he's appeared in a multitude of feature films and TV, both in Hollywood and internationally. He appeared in the Colin Farrell and Bruce Willis film Hart's War (2002), and in the Bollywood production Colours of Passion (2008), directed by Ketan Mehta. He was cast by Paul Schrader and Bret Easton Ellis for their film The Canyons (2013), and was a guest star in the Jerry Bruckheimer-produced TV series CSI: Cyber (2015) and the Golden Globe nominated comedy Jane the Virgin (2015).

Boeven began his voiceover career in 1996 and has more than 350 credits, most recently for the international releases of the Brad Pitt film Fury (2014), the Tom Hanks film Bridge of Spies (2015), and the upcoming Captain America: Civil War (2016).

Filmography

References

External links
 Official website
 

1967 births
Living people
German male film actors
German male television actors